Marion Griffin may refer to:
 Marion Mahony Griffin, American architect and artist
 Marion Griffin (lawyer), American lawyer, the first woman to practice law in Tennessee